Verónica G. Ribot de Cañales (born February 27, 1962) is a retired female diver from Argentina. She competed in three consecutive Summer Olympics for her native country, starting in 1984. Ribot claimed a silver and a bronze medal in the Women's 10m Platform at the Pan American Games.

Ribot is married, and has two children, Olympia and Lucas. She took a position as Cornell University's Head Diving Coach in fall of 2007.

See also
 List of divers

References 
 

1962 births
Living people
Divers at the 1984 Summer Olympics
Divers at the 1988 Summer Olympics
Divers at the 1992 Summer Olympics
Olympic divers of Argentina
Place of birth missing (living people)
Argentine female divers
Pan American Games silver medalists for Argentina
Pan American Games bronze medalists for Argentina
Pan American Games medalists in diving
Divers at the 1983 Pan American Games
Divers at the 1987 Pan American Games
Medalists at the 1983 Pan American Games
Medalists at the 1987 Pan American Games
20th-century Argentine women